Pattambi is a taluk at the western end of the Palakkad district of the state of Kerala, India. Town of Pattambi is the administrative headquarters of the taluk. Pattambi taluk is bounded by Ottapalam Taluk of Palakkad district to the east, Ponnani taluk of Malappuram district to the west, Tirur and Perinthalmanna Taluks of Malappuram district to the north, and Kunnamkulam Taluk of Thrissur district to the south.

Villages 
Pattambi Taluk comprises 18 villages (sub-divisions):

Anakkara
Chalissery
Kappur
Koppam
Kulukkallur
Muthuthala
Nagalassery
Ongallur-I
Ongallur-II
Parudur
Pattambi
Pattithara
Thirumittacode-I
Thirumittacode-II
Thiruvegappura
Thrithala
Vallappuzha
Vilayur

Demographics 

 India census, Pattambi Taluk had a population of 467722. it is the most densely populated Taluk in Palakkad district.

History
Pattambi Taluk was declared as the sixth taluk in Palakkad district by chief minister Oommen Chandy on 23 December 2013.

Pattambi was a part of Walluvanad Taluk of British Malabar District, which was one of the two Taluks included in Malappuram Revenue Division of British Malabar, and later became part of Ottapalam taluk and in 23 December 2013,Pattambi became independent taluk .

Notable personalities

The following list contains the names of famous people who came from various parts of Pattambi Taluk created in 2013:
E. Sreedharan
Akkitham Achuthan Namboothiri
M. T. Vasudevan Nair
V. T. Bhattathiripad 
C. P. Mohammed
Major Ravi
Govind Padmasoorya
Anumol
Manikandan Pattambi
Kalamandalam Gopi
M.G. Sasi
Shivaji (Malayalam actor)

See also
[[Pattambi]]
[[Palakkad district]]

References

External links

Cities and towns in Palakkad district